Suzy Kendall (born Freda Harriet Harrison; December 1937 is a British retired actress best known for her film roles in the late 1960s and early 1970s.

Personal life
Born in Belper, Derbyshire, Kendall attended Derby & District College of Art where she studied painting and design. She was a fabric designer at British Celanese and then became a photographic model before becoming an actress. She initially appeared in supporting roles before progressing to female leads in a number of British films in the late 1960s. In the early 1970s, she appeared in several Italian giallo thrillers before returning to Britain and played supporting roles in a few more films until her retirement from screen acting in 1977.

In 1968, Kendall married pianist, comedian and actor Dudley Moore, and though they divorced in 1972, they remained friends until Moore's death in 2002. 

Following the divorce she remarried shortly afterwards to musician Sandy Harper, whom Moore also befriended. Moore was godfather to her daughter Elodie. In 2002 she hosted a memorial service for Moore attended by her second husband and daughter.

Kendall now lives in London with her second husband Sandy Harper. Their daughter Elodie Harper is a journalist (at ITV Anglia) and novelist.

In 2012, Kendall made her first film appearance in 35 years in Berberian Sound Studio, billed in some sources as the mother of the lead character Gilderoy, played by Toby Jones, though the end credits on the film list her as "special guest screamer". The film is about a sound engineer working on an Italian horror film, which alludes to several appearances Kendall made in Italian genre films during the 1970s.

Filmography

 The Liquidator (1965) - Judith
 Thunderball (1965) - Prue (uncredited) 
 Up Jumped a Swagman (1965) - Melissa Smythe-Fury
 Circus of Fear (1966) - Natasha
 The Sandwich Man (1966) - Sue
 To Sir, with Love (1967) - Gillian Blanchard
 The Penthouse (1967) - Barbara Willason
 Up the Junction (1968) - Polly
 30 Is a Dangerous Age, Cynthia (1968) - Louise Hammond
 Fräulein Doktor (1969) - Fraülein Doktor
 The Gamblers (1970) - Candace
 The Bird with the Crystal Plumage (1970) - Julia
 Darker Than Amber (1970) - Vangie / Merrimay
 Assault (aka In the Devil's Garden) (1971) - Julie West
 Fear Is the Key (1972) - Sarah Ruthven
 Torso (1973) - Jane
 Tales That Witness Madness (1973) - Ann / Beatrice (segment 2 "Penny Farthing")
 Story of a Cloistered Nun (1973) - Mother Superior
 Spasmo (1974) - Barbara
 Craze (1974) - Sally 
 To the Bitter End (1975) - Joan Jordan
 Adventures of a Private Eye (1977) - Laura
 Berberian Sound Studio (2012) - Special Guest Screamer

TV appearances
 The Spies (1 episode, 1966) - Polly Katt
 Further Adventures of Lucky Jim (1 episode, 1967)
 The Persuaders! (1 episode, 1971) - Kay Hunter
 Van der Valk (1 episode, 1977) - Marijka

References

External links

Suzy Kendall; Aveleyman.com

1944 births
Living people
English film actresses
People from Belper